Procometis is a genus of moths in the family Autostichidae.

Species
The species of this genus are:

Procometis acharma Meyrick, 1908 (from South Africa)
Procometis acutipennis (Walsingham, 1891) (from Gambia & Congo)
Procometis aplegiopa Turner, 1904 (from Australia)
Procometis bisulcata Meyrick, 1890 (from Australia)
Procometis brunnea (West, 1931) (from Taiwan)
Procometis coniochersa Meyrick, 1922 (from Australia)
Procometis diplocentra Meyrick, 1890 (from Australia)
Procometis genialis Meyrick, 1890 (from Australia)
Procometis hylonoma Meyrick, 1890 (from Australia)
Procometis limitata Meyrick, 1911 (from South Africa)
Procometis lipara Meyrick, 1890 (from Australia)
Procometis melanthes Turner, 1898 (from Australia)
Procometis milvina Meyrick, 1914 (from South Africa)
Procometis mistharma (Meyrick, 1908)
Procometis monocalama Meyrick, 1890 (from Australia)
Procometis ochricilia Meyrick, 1921 (from South Africa)
Procometis oxypora Meyrick, 1908 (from South Africa)
Procometis periscia Lower, 1903 (from Australia)
Procometis phloeodes Turner, 1898 (from Australia)
Procometis sphendonistis (Meyrick, 1908) (from Sri Lanka)
Procometis spoliatrix (Meyrick, 1916) (from India)
Procometis stenarga Turner, 1902 (from Australia)
Procometis terrena Meyrick, 1908 (from Zambia)
Procometis trochala Meyrick, 1908 (from Sri Lanka)

References

De Prins, J. & De Prins, W. 2014. Afromoths, online database of Afrotropical moth species (Lepidoptera). World Wide Web electronic publication (www.afromoths.net) (11-Jan-2015

 
Autostichinae
Moth genera